Daniel C. Levine (born July 30, 1972) is an American actor known for his theatre roles

Early life and education 
Born in Boston, Levine grew up in Framingham, Massachusetts. He earned a Bachelor of Arts degree in theatre and pre-medicine from Brandeis University in 1994 and briefly attended the Tufts University School of Dental Medicine.

Career 
Levins has performed in the Broadway shows Les Misérables, Chicago, Mamma Mia!, The Rocky Horror Show, Jesus Christ Superstar, Tommy, and Little Shop of Horrors. Levine co-starred in the musical version of Chicago with Debbie Gibson. He has also appeared in several films and commercials. He starred as Cousin Kevin in the National Tour of The Who's Tommy.

Filmography

Film

Television

References

External links

American male stage actors
Living people
1972 births
People from Framingham, Massachusetts
Brandeis University alumni
Tufts University School of Dental Medicine alumni